Rayart Pictures was one of the early film production and distribution companies operating independently of the major Hollywood studios in the United States during the later silent film era from the mid-to-late 1920s and into the early "talkies" era of early films with sound in the late 1920s and early 1930s. It established its own distribution network, specialising in westerns. It was begun by W. Ray Johnston in 1924, after whom the company was named. It was originally created as a low budget release agent, and like the other so-called Poverty Row studios, was based in a small plot off Sunset Strip, by Gower Street. An early Poverty Row studio, it was a forerunner of Monogram Pictures, whom was also founded by W. Ray Johnston.

In 1929, Rayart produced a series of musical pieces—featuring Tommy Christian and His Palisades Orchestra— as well as shorts and the feature-length film Howdy Broadway, a musical set in college with "an entirely predictable" script.

Rayart was renamed Raytone with the advent of sound in films. The company became part of Monogram Pictures in a merger with Sono Art-World Wide Pictures in 1933.

Filmography
 

 Midnight Secrets (1924)
 The Street of Tears (1924)
 For Another Woman (1924)
 The Pell Street Mystery (1924)
 Trail Dust (1924)
 Lightning Romance (1924)
 Geared to Go (1924)
Double Fisted (1925) 
 Ace of Clubs (1925)
 Buried Gold (1925)
 The Pride of the Force (1925)
 Cyclone Cavalier (1925)
 The Right Man (1925)
 The Fear Fighter (1925)
 Bashful Buccaneer (1925)
 Fighting Luck (1925)
 The Road Agent (1925)
 Goat Getter (1925)
 The Knockout Kid (1925)
 Starlight, the Untamed (1925)
 The Flame Fighter (1925)
 Border Vengeance (1925)
 Mistaken Orders (1925)
 Fighting Fate (1925)
 Secret Service Sanders (1925)
Super Speed (1925)
Winning a Woman (1925)
 Crack o' Dawn (1925)
 Dangerous Fists (1925)
 Once in a Lifetime (1925)
 The Snob Buster (1925)
 A Desperate Chance (1925)
 Youth's Gamble (1925)
 Getting 'Em Right (1925)
Easy Money (1925)
The Wolf Hunters (1926)
 The Dixie Flyer (1926)
Temporary Sheriff (1926) 
 One Punch O'Day (1926)
 The Midnight Limited (1926)
 Somebody's Mother (1926)
 Perils of the Coast Guard (1926)
 Phantom Police (1926)
 Broadway Billy (1926)
 The Self Starter (1926)
 Moran of the Mounted (1926)
 Danger Quest (1926)
 The Patent Leather Pug (1926)
West of Rainbow's End (1926)
The Heart of a Coward (1926)
The Fighting Thorobreds (1926) 
 Mystery Pilot (1926)
 The Windjammer (1926)
 The Call of the Klondike (1926)
 The Dangerous Dude (1926)
 The Last Alarm (1926)
 Thrilling Youth (1926)
 The Man from Oklahoma (1926)
 Racing Romance (1926)
 Crossed Signals (1926)
 The Baited Trap (1926)
 The High Flyer (1926)
 Scotty of the Scouts (1926)
 Kentucky Handicap (1926)
 Rapid Fire Romance (1926)
 Oh Billy, Behave (1926)
 The Winner (1926)
 Speed Crazed (1926)
 The Smoke Eaters (1926)
 A Captain's Courage (1926)
 Tentacles of the North (1926)
 Trooper 77 (1926)
 Speed Cop (1926)
 Wolves of the Desert (1926)
 Hi-Jacking Rustlers (1926)
 Stick to Your Story (1926)
 The Night Owl (1926)
 The Grey Devil (1926)
 The Gallant Fool (1926)
 West of the Law (1926)
 Sheriff's Girl (1926)
 Fighting for Fame (1927)
 The Mystery Brand (1927)
 The Scorcher (1927)
 Speeding Hoofs (1927)
The Show Girl (1927)
 Where North Holds Sway (1927)
 A Yellow Streak (1927)
 The Laffin' Fool (1927)
 The Midnight Watch (1927)
 Riders of the West (1927)
 The Lost Limited (1927)
 The Range Riders (1927)
 Western Courage (1927)
 Thunderbolt's Tracks (1927)
 Code of the Range (1927)
 Speedy Smith (1927)
 The Racing Fool (1927)
 Ridin' Luck (1927)
 Smiling Billy (1927)
 A Wanderer of the West (1927)
 The Silent Hero (1927)
 The Cruise of the Hellion (1927)
 A Boy of the Streets (1927)
 Gun-Hand Garrison (1927)
 Prince of the Plains (1927)
 The King of the Jungle (1927)
 Heroes in Blue (1927)
 On the Stroke of Twelve (1927)
 Casey Jones (1927)
 Wild Born (1927)
 The Royal American (1927)
 Daring Deeds (1927)
 Modern Daughters (1927)
 Romantic Rogue (1927)
 A Light in the Window (1927)
 The Wheel of Destiny (1927)
 When Seconds Count (1927)
Gypsy of the North (1928)
 You Can't Beat the Law (1928)
 The Law and the Man (1928)
 The Phantom of the Turf (1928)
 My Home Town (1928)
 The Painted Trail (1928)
 Danger Patrol (1928)
 Mystery Valley (1928)
 Sweet Sixteen (1928)
 The City of Purple Dreams (1928)
 The Branded Man (1928)
 Trail Riders (1928)
 Lightnin' Shot (1928)
 The Devil's Tower (1928)
 Trailin' Back (1928)
 Ships of the Night (1928)
 The Black Pearl (1928)
 The Man from Headquarters (1928)
 The Divine Sinner (1928)
 The Midnight Adventure (1928)
 Sisters of Eve (1928)
 Isle of Lost Men (1928)
 Should a Girl Marry? (1928)
The Heart of Broadway (1928)
 Some Mother's Boy (1929)
 Handcuffed (1929)
 Bride of the Desert (1929)
 Howdy Broadway (1929)
 Brothers (1929)
 The Devil's Chaplain (1929)
 Anne Against the World (1929)
 Overland Bound (1929)
 When Dreams Come True (1929)
 Shanghai Rose (1929)
Two Sisters (1929), a production with sound
 Beyond the Law (1930), a production with sound

References

Film production companies of the United States
American companies established in 1924
Mass media companies established in 1924